The 2018 Rinnai 250 was the 2nd stock car race of the 2018 NASCAR Xfinity Series season, and the 27th iteration of the event. The race was held on Saturday, February 24, 2018 in Hampton, Georgia at Atlanta Motor Speedway, a 1.54 miles (2.48 km) permanent asphalt quad-oval intermediate speedway. The race took the scheduled 163 laps to complete. At race's end, Kevin Harvick driving for Stewart-Haas Racing with Biagi-DenBeste would dominate the race and win his 1st and only win of the season driving a part-time schedule. The win was the 47th, and so far as of 2021, final win of his NASCAR Xfinity Series career. To fill out the podium, Joey Logano of Team Penske and Christopher Bell of Joe Gibbs Racing would finish second and third, respectively.

Background 
Atlanta Motor Speedway (formerly Atlanta International Raceway) is a track in Hampton, Georgia, 20 miles (32 km) south of Atlanta. It is a 1.54-mile (2.48 km) quad-oval track with a seating capacity of 111,000. It opened in 1960 as a 1.5-mile (2.4 km) standard oval. In 1994, 46 condominiums were built over the northeastern side of the track. In 1997, to standardize the track with Speedway Motorsports' other two 1.5-mile (2.4 km) ovals, the entire track was almost completely rebuilt. The frontstretch and backstretch were swapped, and the configuration of the track was changed from oval to quad-oval. The project made the track one of the fastest on the NASCAR circuit.

Entry list 

*Withdrew.

Practice

First practice 
First practice was held on Friday, February 23 at 1:05 PM EST.

Second and final practice 
The second and final practice was held on Friday, February 23 at 3:05 PM EST.

Qualifying 
Qualifying would take place on Saturday, February 24, at 9:10 AM EST. Since Atlanta Motor Speedway is under , the qualifying system was a multi-car system that included three rounds. The first round was 15 minutes, where every driver would be able to set a lap within the 15 minutes. Then, the second round would consist of the fastest 24 cars in Round 1, and drivers would have 10 minutes to set a lap. Round 3 consisted of the fastest 12 drivers from Round 2, and the drivers would have 5 minutes to set a time. Whoever was fastest in Round 3 would win the pole.

Two drivers would fail to qualify: Josh Bilicki and Mike Harmon.

Full qualifying results

Race results 
Stage 1 Laps: 40

Stage 2 Laps: 40

Stage 3 Laps: 83

References 

2018 NASCAR Xfinity Series
NASCAR races at Atlanta Motor Speedway
February 2018 sports events in the United States
2018 in sports in Georgia (U.S. state)